Scaraben (626 m) is a hill in the Northwest Highlands of Scotland. It lies in the Caithness region, in the far north.

Taking the form of a long ridge over 4 km in length, the hill consists of three rounded peaks. The Caithness coast is visible from its summit. Coastal Berriedale is the nearest village.

References

Marilyns of Scotland
Grahams
Mountains and hills of the Northwest Highlands